Jan Plobner (born 26 March 1992) is a German politician for the SPD and since 2021 member of the Bundestag, the German federal parliament.

Life and politics 

Plobner was born 1992 in Nuremberg and studied political science and history, later completing a degree in administrative sciences. 
In 2021 Plobner was elected to the Bundestag. He is queer speaker of SPD in Bundestag.

References 

Living people
1992 births
Social Democratic Party of Germany politicians
Members of the Bundestag 2021–2025
21st-century German politicians
Politicians from Nuremberg
LGBT members of the Bundestag
German LGBT politicians
Gay politicians